Realidades may refer to:

Realidades (TV series), 1970s PBS arts show

Music
Realidades, :es:Realidades, debut album by reggaeton singer Manny Montes 
Realidades, album by Los Tigres del Norte 2014  
"Realidades", song by Nepal from album Ideología 1995  
"Realidades", song by Argentine singer Ariel Nan